Death on the Job is a 1991 documentary film directed by Bill Guttentag. It was nominated for an Academy Award for Best Documentary Feature. It aired on HBO as an episode of America Undercover.

References

External links

Death on the Job at Direct Cinema Limited

1991 films
1991 documentary films
American documentary films
Films directed by Bill Guttentag
1990s English-language films
1990s American films